After Kansas granted women the right to vote in municipal elections in February 1887, Susanna Madora Salter was elected mayor of Argonia, Kansas on April 4, 1887, and became the first female mayor in the United States. Salter had been nominated without her knowledge or consent, as a stunt intended to discourage women from participation in the political process. In 1862, Nancy Smith won the mayoral election of Oskaloosa, Iowa, after being nominated as a "joke", but she declined to hold office.

Following the adoption of the Nineteenth Amendment to the United States Constitution in 1920, Bertha Knight Landes became the first woman mayor of a city with more than 150,000 residents, after she was elected mayor of Seattle, Washington in 1926.

Alabama
1984
Mary Kate Stovall, first female, first African American mayor of Hurtsboro, Alabama

Alaska
2011
Charlotte Brower, first woman elected mayor of North Slope Borough, Alaska

Arizona
1927
Fanne Gaar, first woman elected mayor in Arizona, mayor of Casa Grande, Arizona
1973
Ethel Berger, first woman mayor in Sierra Vista, Arizona. Berger was appointed, not elected; at that time mayors were appointed from the city council.
1976
Margaret Hance, first woman elected Mayor of Phoenix, Arizona
1995
Joan Shafer, first woman elected mayor of Surprise, Arizona

Arkansas
1925
Maude Duncan, first woman elected mayor of Winslow, Arkansas
1966
Katherine Green, first woman to serve as mayor of Eureka Springs, Arkansas
1975
Joyce Ferguson, who had the distinction of being the city of West Memphis's first female mayor. Mayor Ferguson served two terms as mayor of West Memphis, from 1975 to 1982. West Memphis, Arkansas

California
1915
Estelle Lawton Lindsey, first woman to execute the duties of Mayor of Los Angeles, California 
it occurred when Los Angeles Mayor Henry R. Rose was absent from his post in September 1915 and directed Lindsey, a member of the city council, to fill-in as acting mayor.
1916
Ellen French Aldrich, first woman elected mayor of Sawtelle, California
1924
Jesse Elwyn Nelson, first woman elected mayor of Signal Hill, California
Edwina Benner, first woman elected mayor of Sunnyvale, California
1926
Mattle Chandler, first woman mayor of Richmond, California
1929
Emily Jones, first woman elected mayor of Eureka, California
1941
Helen Lawrence, first female mayor of San Leandro, California
1948
Belle Cooledge, first female mayor of Sacramento, California
1953
Mabel Richey, first woman mayor of Lodi, California
1968
Rena Parker, first woman mayor of Corona, California
1971
Lorette Wood, first woman mayor of Santa Cruz, California

1973
Doris A. Davis, first woman and first African American woman elected mayor in the City of Compton.

1974
Janet Gray Hayes, first woman elected Mayor of San Jose, California
1976
Floretta K. Lauber, first woman mayor of Arcadia, California.
Phyllis Sweeney, first woman elected mayor of Laguna Beach, California
1977
Eleanor Crouch, first woman elected mayor of Santa Paula, California
1978
Frances Prince, first woman to become mayor of Thousand Oaks, California
also served 1983 to 1984
Dianne Feinstein, first woman mayor of San Francisco
1979
Clo Hoover, first woman elected mayor of Santa Monica, California
1980
Eunice Sato, first woman elected mayor of Long Beach, California
1981
Mary K. Shell, first woman elected mayor of Bakersfield, California
1982
Loretta Thompson-Glickman, first African-American woman mayor of Pasadena, California
also first African-American woman mayor of a city over 100,000 people 
1982
Mary Lou Howard, first woman mayor of Burbank, California.
1983
Jana Wilson, first woman mayor of Oroville, California
1986
Maureen O'Connor, first woman elected mayor of San Diego, California

1990
Alice Jempsa, Los Alamitos, California
1997
Jessica Maes, first woman elected mayor of Huntington Park, California
2011
Laura Roughton, first woman elected mayor of Jurupa Valley, California
also first mayor of Jurupa Valley, California
Jean Quan, first woman elected mayor of Oakland, California
also the first Asian-American mayor of Oakland

2012

Frances Ann Romero, first woman elected mayor of Guadalupe, California

2016

Michelle Roman, first woman elected Mayor of Kingsburg, California

2017
Tasha Cerda first woman and person of either African American and Native American descent to be elected Mayor of Gardena, California
also first person of Native American descent to be elected mayor in the state of California

2018
Alison Kerr, first woman elected Mayor of Del Rey Oaks, California

2020
Christy Holstege first woman elected Mayor of Palm Springs
2022
Karen Bass, first woman elected mayor of Los Angeles

Ashleigh Aitken first woman elected mayor of Anaheim

Colorado
1916
C. I. Driver, first woman to serve as mayor of Lone Rock, Colorado 
was appointed by the city council
1929
Elizabeth Lower, first woman to be elected mayor of Grover, Colorado
1965
Norma O. Walker, first woman mayor of Aurora, Colorado
1969
Eve Homeyer, first woman elected mayor of Aspen, Colorado
1995
Mary Lou Makepeace, first woman mayor of Colorado Springs, Colorado

Connecticut
1967
Ann Uccello, also known as Antonina Uccello, first woman mayor of Hartford, Connecticut
1987
Carrie Saxon Perry, first African-American woman elected mayor of Hartford, Connecticut
2007
April Capone Almon, first woman elected mayor of East Haven, Connecticut
2013
Deb Hinchey, first woman elected mayor of Norwich, Connecticut
Toni Harp, first woman elected mayor, and first female African-American mayor of New Haven, Connecticut
Anita Dugatto, first woman elected mayor of Derby, Connecticut
2017
Nancy Rossi, first woman elected mayor of West Haven, Connecticut
2021

Carolin Simmons, first woman elected mayor of Stamford, Connecticut.

Delaware
1966
Norma Handloff, first woman mayor of Newark, Delaware and of a Delaware city

Florida
1917

Marian Newhall Horwitz, first woman who served as mayor of Moore Haven, Florida
also first woman mayor in Florida
1921
Ellen M. Anderson, first woman mayor of Lantana, Florida
1922
Dr. Josie Rogers, first woman mayor of Daytona, Florida
1928
Lena Culver Hawkins, first woman mayor  of Brooksville, Florida
1951
Marie Kiser Cross, first woman mayor of Jupiter, Florida
1961
Violet Kusbel Cimbora, first woman elected mayor in Florida. Mayor of Masaryktown, Florida
1976
Dorothy Wilken, first woman elected mayor of Boca Raton, Florida
1978
Helen Wilkes, first woman to become Mayor of West Palm Beach, Florida
1987
Sandra Warshaw Freedman, first woman elected mayor of Tampa, Florida
1994
Edna Griffith, first woman mayor of Orange Park, Florida. Also, first woman elected and reelected to the Town Council

2006
Patricia Christensen, first woman elected mayor of Port St. Lucie, Florida
2007
Rita Ellis, first woman elected mayor of Delray Beach, Florida

Matti Herrera Bower, first woman elected mayor of Miami Beach, Florida
2014
Mayra Peña Lindsay, first woman mayor of Key Biscayne, Florida
2015
Gail Ash, first woman elected mayor of Clermont, Florida
2016
Milissa Holland, first woman elected mayor of Palm Coast, Florida
2017
Daisy Raisler, first woman elected mayor of Hispanic descent of Lake Helen, Florida

Georgia
1921
Alice Harrell Strickland, first woman elected mayor in the U.S. state of Georgia, in Duluth, Georgia

1934
Mrs. Adele (wife of Solomon S.) Youmans, first woman mayor of Oak Park, Georgia

1978
Carrie Kent, first African-American woman mayor of Walthourville, Georgia

1991
Susan Weiner, first woman elected Mayor of Savannah, Georgia

2001
Shirley Franklin, first woman and black woman elected mayor of Atlanta, Georgia

2010
Teresa Tomlinson, first woman elected mayor of Columbus, Georgia

2012
Dorothy Hubbard, first woman elected mayor of Albany, Georgia

2017
Mary Parham-Copelan was the first African-American woman to be elected to the office of Mayor of Milledgeville, Georgia. This race was historic because there has never been an elected female to the office of Mayor throughout the city's 205-year history.

Hawaii
1981
Eileen Anderson, first woman elected Mayor of Honolulu, Hawaii
1991
Linda Lingle, first woman elected Mayor of Maui, Hawaii

Idaho
1898
Jesse Parker, first woman mayor of Kendrick, Idaho
also the first woman mayor in the state of Idaho.
2003
Carolyn Terteling-Payne, first woman Mayor of Boise, Idaho

Illinois
1911
Kate F. O'Connor, first woman mayor of Arcadia, Illinois
1915
A. R. Canfield, first woman mayor of Warren, Illinois
1923
Nora Gammon, first woman mayor of Thebes, Illinois
1949
Rose M. Brown, first woman mayor of Tinley Park, Illinois
1979
Jane M. Byrne, first woman elected Mayor of Chicago, Illinois
Byrne was also the first female mayor of any United States city with more than 3 million residents.
1983
Helen Westberg, first woman mayor of Carbondale, Illinois
2001
Bette Thomas, first black female Mayor of North Chicago, Illinois

Indiana
1957
Mary Jancosek Bercik, first woman mayor of Whiting, Indiana, and first woman mayor in Indiana
1980
Patricia Logan, first woman elected mayor of Noblesville, Indiana
1999
Shirley Robb, first woman elected mayor of Princeton, Indiana
2000
Kathleen Chroback, first woman elected mayor of La Porte, Indiana
2006
Olga Velazquez, first woman elected mayor of Portage, Indiana
2007
Barbara Ewing, first female Democrat elected mayor of Tell City, Indiana
2007
Shawna M. Gurgis, first woman elected mayor of Bedford, Indiana
2011
Karen Freeman-Wilson, first woman elected mayor of Gary, Indiana  and first African-American woman elected mayor in the State of Indiana

Iowa
1862
Nancy Smith, first woman elected mayor in the United States in Oskaloosa, Iowa in 1862.
Smith declined to serve as mayor.
1923
Emma J. Harvat, first woman elected mayor of Iowa City, Iowa
first woman in the United States to be elected mayor of a city with more than 10,000 inhabitants
1973
Julianne M. Jensen was elected the first woman mayor of Knoxville, Iowa
2013
Diana Willits, first woman elected mayor of Windsor Heights, Iowa

Kansas

1800s
1887
Susanna M. Salter, first woman elected mayor of Argonia, Kansas
the first woman to serve as mayor of an American city.
1888
Mary D. Lowman, first woman elected mayor of Oskaloosa, Kansas
also the second woman mayor in Kansas. She served alongside the first all-woman city council in the United States. They were all re-elected in 1889.
1889
Lucy Sullivan, first woman mayor of Baldwin, Kansas
1893
Mrs. Barnes, elected the first woman mayor of Geuda Springs, Kansas in 1893.
1894
Anna Austin, first woman mayor of Pleasanton, Kansas [population approx., 1,500]
1896
C. A. Curtis, first woman mayor of Cimarron, Kansas
M. A. Wade, the first woman mayor of Ellis, Kansas
Wade served with an all-woman municipal government.
1897
Juno Strain, first woman mayor of Jamestown, Kansas

1900s
1911
Ella Wilson, first woman mayor of Hunnewell, Kansas
1913
Mrs. H. C. Defenbaugh, first woman elected mayor in Tyro, Kansas
1917
Avis Francis, first woman mayor of Valley Center, Kansas
1920
Louise Fussman, mayor Humboldt, Kansas
1945
Daisy Dean Spencer, first woman elected mayor of Netwon, Kansas
1975
Connie Ames Peters, first woman elected mayor of Wichita, Kansas
1997
Joan Wagnon, first woman elected of mayor of Topeka, Kansas

2020

Sarah J Boeh-Cerra, first woman mayor of Troy, Kansas

Kentucky
1951
Rebekah H. Hord, first woman mayor in Kentucky, Maysville Kentucky
1993
Pam Miller, first woman mayor of Lexington, Kentucky

Louisiana
1920
Lula V. Coleman, Deputy Sheriff of LaSalle Parish, is appointed Mayor of Jena, Louisiana by Governor John M. Parker as the first woman mayor in Louisiana
1925
Maggie Skipwith Smith, first woman elected mayor in Louisiana and of Wilson, Louisiana
1956
Mary Estus Jones Webb, first woman to serve as Mayor-President of Baton Rouge, Louisiana 
1990
Hazel Beard, first woman elected mayor of Shreveport, Louisiana
1993
Willie Mount, first woman elected mayor of Lake Charles, Louisiana
2017
Sharon Weston Broome first woman elected as Mayor-President of Baton Rouge
2018
Latoya Cantrell, first woman elected mayor of New Orleans, Louisiana

Maine
1946
Helen C. Frost, first woman mayor of Portland, Maine

Maryland
2001
Ellen O. Moyer, first woman elected mayor of Annapolis, Maryland
2007
Sheila Dixon, first black woman elected mayor of Baltimore, Maryland

Massachusetts
1939
Alice Burke, first woman elected as mayor in New England—in Westfield, Massachusetts
1955
Beatrice Corliss, first woman elected mayor of Gloucester, Massachusetts (weak-mayor government, elected by city council).
1964
Ellen A. Sampson, first woman elected mayor of Lowell, Massachusetts (weak-mayor government, elected by city council).
1972
Barbara Ackermann, first woman elected mayor of Cambridge, Massachusetts (weak-mayor government, elected by city council).
1982
Sara Robertson, first woman elected mayor of Worcester, Massachusetts (weak-mayor government, elected by city council)
Cynthia G. Kruger, first woman to serve as mayor of New Bedford, Massachusetts (as council president, Kruger became the acting Mayor when the office became vacant).
1983
Brenda Reed, first woman elected mayor of Attleboro, Massachusetts.
1986
Marilyn Porreca, first woman elected mayor of Medford, Massachusetts (weak-mayor government, elected by city council)
1987
Anne Wojtkowski, first woman elected mayor of Pittsfield, Massachusetts.
1989
Mary Hurley, first woman elected mayor of Springfield, Massachusetts.
1991
Mary Ford, first woman elected mayor of Northampton, Massachusetts.
1992
Rosemary S. Tierney, first woman elected mayor of New Bedford, Massachusetts.
1993
Mary Claire Kennedy, first woman mayor of Lawrence, Massachusetts.
Lisa L. Mead, first woman elected mayor of Newburyport, Massachusetts.
1997
Mary H. Whitney, first woman elected mayor of Fitchburg, Massachusetts.
1999
Dorothy Kelly Gay, first woman mayor of Somerville, Massachusetts.
Sharon Pollard, first woman elected mayor of Methuen, Massachusetts.
2003
Jeannette A. McCarthy, first woman elected mayor of Waltham, Massachusetts.
2005
Kim Driscoll, first woman elected mayor of Salem, Massachusetts
Nancy E. Stevens, first woman elected mayor of Marlborough, Massachusetts.
2007
Susan M. Kay, first woman elected mayor of Weymouth, Massachusetts
Konstantina Lukes, first popularly-elected woman mayor of Worcester, Massachusetts (weak-mayor government)
Carolyn Kirk, first popularly-elected woman mayor of Gloucester, Massachusetts.
2009
Linda Balzotti, first woman elected mayor of Brockton, Massachusetts.
Judith Flanagan Kennedy, first woman elected mayor of Lynn, Massachusetts.
Elaine A. Pluta, first woman elected mayor of Holyoke, Massachusetts.
2016
Stephanie Muccini Burke, first popularly-elected woman mayor of Medford, Massachusetts.
2017
Ruthanne Fuller, first woman elected mayor of Newton, Massachusetts
Yvonne Spicer, first woman elected mayor of Framingham, Massachusetts. Also the first mayor of Framingham and the first African-American woman mayor in Massachusetts.
2018
Gail Infurna, first woman to serve as mayor of Melrose, Massachusetts (elected by city council to finish term of Robert J. Dolan).
2021
Kim Janey, first woman to serve as acting mayor of Boston (upon the resignation of Marty Walsh to take the position of United States Secretary of Labor in the Cabinet of Joe Biden).

Michelle Wu, first woman elected mayor of Boston.

Michigan
1973
 Betty Lee Ongley, first woman mayor of Portage, Michigan 
 Bette Davis, first woman mayor of South Haven, Michigan
 Elizabeth Brater, first woman mayor of Ann Arbor, Michigan
2015
Karen Weaver, first woman mayor of Flint, Michigan
Rosalynn Bliss, first woman mayor of Grand Rapids, Michigan
2018
Lindsey McGuire-Fountain, first woman mayor and President of DeTour Village, Michigan

Minnesota
1921
Lillian Cox Gault, first woman elected mayor of St. Peter, Minnesota and in any city of Minnesota
1921
Florence J. Pierce, the first woman elected mayor of Goodhue, Minnesota
1925
Elizabeth Ries, first woman elected mayor of Shakopee, Minnesota  
1953
Agnes Israelson, first woman elected mayor in Thief River Falls, Minnesota
1973
Ione Ellingson, first woman elected mayor in Menahga, Minnesota
1992
Jane Robbins, first woman elected mayor of Pine City, Minnesota
1994
Sharon Sayles Belton, first woman and first African-American elected mayor of Minneapolis, Minnesota
2008
Mary Rossing, first woman elected mayor of Northfield, Minnesota
2013
Del Rae Williams, first woman elected mayor of Moorhead, Minnesota
2018
Najwa Massad, first woman elected mayor of Mankato, Minnesota
Kim Norton, first woman elected mayor of Rochester, Minnesota

Mississippi
1950
Dorothy Painter Crawford, first woman elected mayor in Mississippi, Madison, Mississippi
1977
Unita Blackwell, first African American woman elected mayor in Mississippi, Mayersville, Mississippi
2001
Yvonne Brown, first black woman elected mayor of Tchula, Mississippi; first black Republican woman elected mayor in the state of Mississippi.
2005
Sheriel F. Perkins, first woman and African American elected mayor of Greenwood, Mississippi
2009
Cheri Barry, first woman elected mayor of Meridian, Mississippi
2017
Lynn Spruill, first woman elected mayor of Starkville, MS.

Missouri
1921
Mayme Ousley, first woman elected mayor of St. James, Missouri
Ousley was also the first woman elected mayor in the state of Missouri
1924
Mildred Putnam, first woman elected mayor of Stoutsville, Missouri
1936

Edith Pearce, first woman elected mayor of Greentop, Missouri

1977

Lillian Herman, first woman mayor of Hannibal, Missouri

1982

Barbara Potts, first woman elected mayor of Independence, Missouri

1999

Kay Barnes, first woman elected Mayor of Kansas City, Missouri
2017
Lyda Krewson first woman elected mayor of Saint Louis, Missouri

Montana
1947
Juliet Gregory, first woman mayor of Missoula, Montana

Nebraska
1921
Mary Peterson, first woman elected mayor of Red Cloud, Nebraska
1975
Helen Boosalis, first woman elected mayor of Lincoln, Nebraska
2006
Margaret Hornady, first woman elected mayor of Grand Island, Nebraska
2013
Jean Stothert, first woman elected mayor of Omaha, Nebraska

Nevada
1985
Lorna Kesterson, first woman elected mayor of Henderson, Nevada
1999
Jan Laverty Jones, first woman elected Mayor of Las Vegas, Nevada

New Hampshire
1944
Mary Carey Dondero, first woman mayor of Portsmouth, New Hampshire
2007
Donnalee Lozeau, first woman elected mayor of Nashua, New Hampshire
2015
Caroline McCarley, first woman elected mayor of Rochester, New Hampshire
2017
Joyce Craig first woman elected mayor of Manchester, New Hampshire

New Jersey
1925
Rebecca Estell Bourgeois Winston, first woman elected mayor in New Jersey; first mayor and founder of Estell Manor
1950
Katharine Elkus White, first woman mayor of Red Bank, New Jersey
1951
Vera Martucci, first woman appointed mayor of Teterboro, New Jersey
1967
Mary "Peggy" Kerr, first woman mayor of Sayreville, New Jersey, elected with three female councilwomen, creating the first female-majority municipal government in New Jersey
1972
Doris Mahalick, first woman elected mayor of Wallington and first in Bergen County
1973
Eileen Lloyd, first woman elected mayor of Keansburg, New Jersey
1974
Eleanor Kieliszek, first woman elected Mayor of Teaneck, New Jersey
1977
Maria Barnaby Greenwald, first woman elected mayor of Cherry Hill, New Jersey
1980
 Elizabeth G. Baumgartner, first women mayor of Madison, New Jersey
1988
Janet Whitman, first female mayor of Summit, New Jersey
2000
Gwendolyn Faison (1925 – 2021), first female mayor of Camden (2000 - 2010)
2002
Nancy Merse, first woman mayor of Edgewater, New Jersey
2008
Wilda Diaz, first woman elected mayor of Perth Amboy, New Jersey
2013
Stacey Jordan, first woman elected mayor of Moorestown, New Jersey
2014
Tana Raymond, first woman elected mayor of Garfield, New Jersey
2015
Christine Dansereau, first woman elected mayor of Roselle, New Jersey
 Deirdre A. Dillon, first woman Mayor of Ramsey
2020
Dina Grilo, first woman elected Mayor of East Newark, New Jersey
LaDaena Thomas, first woman elected mayor of Penns Grove, and the first african american woman to be elected in Salem County, New Jersey

New Mexico
1936
Mrs. W. P. Crater, first woman mayor of Des Moines, New Mexico

1982
 Consuelo Salazar-Thompson, first woman mayor of Espanola, New Mexico

1994
Debbie Jaramillo, first woman mayor of Santa Fe, New Mexico

New York
1929
Bessie Moore, first woman elected mayor of Candor (village), New York
Moore won by write-in vote and refused to take the oath of office
1937
Kathrine Wykle, mayor of Clyde, New York
also the first woman mayor in New York
1945
Walker, first woman mayor of Lisle (village), New York
1949
Edith P. Welty, first woman Mayor of Yonkers, New York
1955
Ragina Balas, first woman elected mayor of Ferry Village, New York
1957
Elizabeth Hall, first woman mayor of Sag Harbor, New York
Betty Potter, first woman mayor of Mount Kisco, New York
1973
Barbara Impellittiere, first woman elected mayor of Cold Spring, New York
1974
Mimi Bryan, first woman elected mayor of Piermont, New York
Anne Kaplan, first woman mayor of Monticello, New York
1975
Ruth Blankman, first woman elected mayor of Canton, New York
Eleanor A. Simpson, first woman elected mayor in Old Westbury, New York
also first woman elected mayor in Nassau County, New York
1977
Suzi Oppenheimer, first woman elected mayor of Mamaroneck (village), New York
1979
Virginia Smith, first woman mayor of Ticonderoga, New York
1981
Juanita Crabb, first woman elected Mayor of Binghamton, New York
1984
Karen Johnson, first woman elected mayor of Schenectady, New York 
1987
Laura Slate, first woman elected mayor of Gouverneur, New York
1993
Shirley Seney, first woman mayor of Lake Placid, New York
1995
Christine Korff, first woman elected mayor of Port Chester, New York
2001
Lauren Fortmiller, first woman elected mayor of Sag Harbor, New York
also the first lesbian mayor of Sag Harbor
Sandra Strader, first woman elected mayor of Tupper Lake, New York
2008
Patricia Sweetland, first woman mayor of Adams, New York
2009
Stephanie Miner, first women elected mayor of Syracuse, New York
2013
Trish Abato, first woman elected mayor of Suffern, New York
Ashley Hennings, first woman elected mayor of Newport, New York
Kathy Sheehan, first woman elected mayor of Albany, New York
Lovely Warren, first woman elected mayor, and first African-American woman mayor of Rochester, New York

North Carolina
1922
Maude R. Satterthwaite, first woman mayor of Stonewall, North Carolina

1923
Katherine Staton of New London, first Female mayor in North Carolina and first female elected to municipal government in NC. 
1924
Katherine Mayo Cowan, first woman mayor of Wilmington, North Carolina

1954-1962 - Evelyn Kent , First Female Mayor of Granite Falls, Caldwell County , North Carolina : Cite McCall, M. (1999). Etched in granite: The history of granite falls, North Carolina.

1975
Beth Finch, first woman elected mayor of Fayetteville, North Carolina
 Ruth West, first woman mayor of Carrboro, North Carolina
1977
Isabella Cannon, first woman elected mayor of Raleigh, North Carolina
1981
Deborah Ponder Baker, first woman mayor of Hot Springs, North Carolina
1985
Ella Bengel, first woman elected mayor of New Bern, North Carolina
1987
Sue Myrick, first woman elected Mayor of Charlotte, North Carolina
1989
Martha S. Wood, first woman elected mayor of Winston-Salem, North Carolina
1991
Mary Kanyha, first woman mayor of Pine Knoll Shores, North Carolina
1993
Carolyn Allen first woman elected mayor of Greensboro, North Carolina
1995
Rosemary Waldorf, first woman elected Mayor of Chapel Hill, North Carolina
1999
Jennifer Stultz, first woman elected mayor of Gastonia, North Carolina
2017
Marla Thompson first woman elected mayor of Long View, North Carolina

North Dakota

1946
Agnes Geelan, first woman elected Mayor of Enderlin, North Dakota

1982
Mona Marchus, first woman elected Mayor of Bottineau, North Dakota

Ohio
Anna (Hines) Covault- first female mayor- Fletcher, Ohio:

1921:
Amy A. Kaukonen, first woman elected mayor in Fairport Harbor, Ohio
1923
Mary McFadden, first woman mayor of Magnetic Springs, Ohio who was appointed by the city council at the age of 80.
1954
Dorothy N. Dolbey, first woman elected mayor in Cincinnati, Ohio
1961
Myrtle Reed, first woman mayor of Grand River, Ohio
1966
Lucille Barbato Reed, first woman elected mayor of Cuyahoga County, Ohio. She served as Mayor of Bedford Heights, Ohio for 15 years. Her administration was instrumental in developing the Reed Park Development, which is the site of the outdoor pool and picnic pavilion. The city saw the most rapid expansion under her administration, doubling the population. The present City Hall and the onset of the many programs that transpired from here resulted in a long term for Mayor Reed. Mayor Reed served until 1981 when she decided not to run again. 
1972
Ellen Walker Craig-Jones of Urbancrest, Ohio became the first African-American woman to be elected mayor, by popular vote, of a United States municipality.
1984
Donna Owens, first woman elected Mayor of Toledo, Ohio
2001
Rhine McLin, first woman elected mayor of Dayton, Ohio
2001
Jane Leaver, first woman elected mayor of Medina, Ohio
2002
Jane L. Campbell, first woman elected mayor of Cleveland, Ohio
2016
Annette M. Blackwell, first woman elected mayor of Maple Heights, Ohio
2017
Carrie Schlade first woman elected mayor of Bryan, Ohio

Oklahoma
1971
Patience Latting, first woman elected mayor of Oklahoma City, Oklahoma
 Latting was also the first female mayor of any major U.S. city with more than 350,000 residents.
1992
M. Susan Savage, first woman elected mayor of Tulsa, Oklahoma

Oregon

1895
Alice E. Burns, first woman mayor of Florence, Oregon
Burns was also the first woman elected in the state of Oregon. Women were elected to all other town offices as well.
1912
Clara C. Munson, first woman mayor of Warrenton, Oregon
also the first woman elected mayor following the passage of the equal suffrage law in Oregon. Some sources, including The Daily Astorian, erroneously call Munson the first woman elected mayor in Oregon, however, that distinction belongs to Alice E. Burns who was elected mayor of Florence, Oregon in 1895.
1914
Clara Latourell Larsson, first woman elected mayor of Troutdale, Oregon
1917
Laura Jane Starcher, first woman elected mayor of Umatilla, Oregon
1918
Blanch Shelley, first woman elected mayor of Sandy, Oregon
1920
Bernice Pitts, first woman to execute the office of Mayor of Portland, Oregon
Pitts, a student at Richmond School, served as mayor in place of George Luis Baker for five minutes191
1928

Lettie P. Sankey, first woman elected mayor of Sweet Home, Oregon. She served for 1929 & 1930. Her husband W.S. Sankey took a leave of absence from his city council  term during her tenure as mayor. "I refuse to take orders from the battle axe on the council, when she always bosses me around at home." Mr. Sankey said.

1949
Dorothy McCullough Lee, first woman mayor of Portland, Oregon
1955
Mary Van Stevens, first woman elected mayor of Heppner, Oregon 
She resigned in 1956 after purchasing a business in The Dalles, Oregon.
1981
Joy Burgess, first woman elected mayor of Milwaukie, Oregon
Ruth Burleigh, first woman elected mayor of Bend, Oregon
1983
Sue Miller, first woman elected mayor of Salem, Oregon
1985
Shirley Huffman, first woman elected mayor of Hillsboro, Oregon

1989

Carol Heinkel, first woman elected mayor of Coburg, Oregon

1993
Ruth Bascom, first woman mayor of Eugene, Oregon
2000
Lore Christopher, first woman elected mayor of Keizer, Oregon
2017
Carol Westfall, first woman elected mayor of Klamath Falls, Oregon

Pennsylvania
1959
Jennie Black, first woman elected Mayor of Smithfield, Pennsylvania

1977
Betty Marshall, first woman elected Mayor of York, Pennsylvania
1989
Janice Stork, first woman elected Mayor of Lancaster, Pennsylvania
1993
Anne Jones, first woman elected mayor of Pottstown, Pennsylvania
2009
Donna McFadden-Connors, first woman appointed mayor of Pittston, Pennsylvania
Linda Thompson, first women elected mayor of and first African-American mayor of Harrisburg, Pennsylvania
2022
Rita Frealing, first women elected mayor and first African-American mayor of Gettysburg, Pennsylvania

Rhode Island
2008
Jeanne-Marie Napolitano, first woman mayor of Newport, Rhode Island

South Carolina

1925

Rosa Belle Eaddy Woodberry Dickson, first woman elected mayor of Johnsonville, South Carolina and first woman mayor in the state.

1992
Cheryll Woods-Flowers, first woman elected mayor of Mount Pleasant, South Carolina
2008
Elise Partin, first woman elected mayor of Cayce, South Carolina
Alys Lawson, first woman elected mayor of Conway, South Carolina
Pam Lee, first woman elected mayor of Mullins, South Carolina

South Dakota
1922
Hattie Pickles, first woman elected mayor in South Dakota, in Clark, South Dakota

1950
Kate Soldat, first woman elected mayor of Sturgis, South Dakota

Tennessee
1940
Mary Ellen Presnell Brendle, first woman mayor of Englewood, Tennessee
1961
May Ross McDowell, first woman elected mayor of Johnson City, Tennessee
1997
Margaret Feierabend,  first woman chosen as  mayor of Bristol, Tennessee
2011
Madeline Rogero, first woman elected mayor of Knoxville, Tennessee
2015
Megan Barry, first woman elected mayor of Nashville, Tennessee

Texas

1917
Ophelia “Birdie” Crosby Harwood, mayor of Marble Falls, Texas
also the first woman mayor in Texas, elected by an all-male vote three years before women were allowed to vote.
1920

Hattie Barnes Adkisson, first woman mayor of Jewett, Texas,
1975
Lila Cockrell, first woman elected mayor of San Antonio, Texas
1976
Adlene Harrison, first woman mayor of Dallas, Texas
1977
Carole Keeton Strayhorn, first woman elected mayor of Austin, Texas
1982
Kathryn J. Whitmire, first woman elected mayor of Houston, Texas
1985
Ann Pomykal, first woman elected mayor of Lewisville, Texas
1987
Annette Strauss, first woman elected mayor of Dallas, Texas
Betty Turner, first woman elected mayor of Corpus Christi, Texas
1989
Suzie Azar, first woman elected mayor of El Paso, Texas
!991
Kay Granger, first female mayor of Fort Worth, Texas
1999
Blanca Vela, first woman elected mayor of Brownsville, Texas
2014
Celeste Sanchez, first woman elected mayor of San Benito, Texas
2015
Laura Hill, first woman elected mayor of Southlake, Texas

Utah

1912
Mary E. Woolley Chamberlain, first woman mayor of Kanab, Utah
1919
Stena Scorup, first woman mayor of Salina, Utah
1982
Sue Marie Young, first woman elected mayor of Richfield, Utah
1991
Cosetta Castagno, first woman elected mayor of Vernon, Utah
Joyce Johnson, first woman mayor of Orem, Utah
1992
Deedee Corradini, first woman elected mayor of Salt Lake City, Utah
Stella Welsh, first woman elected mayor of Orem, Utah
1998
JoAnn Seghini, first woman elected mayor of Midvale, Utah
2009
Melissa Johnson, first woman elected mayor of West Jordan, Utah
Mia Love, first woman elected mayor Saratoga Springs, Utah and first black women mayor in Utah
2013
Maile Wilson, first woman elected mayor of Cedar City, Utah
2018
Michelle Kaufusi, first woman elected mayor of Provo, Utah

Vermont
1980
Janet Smith, first woman elected mayor of St. Albans, Vermont, less than a week after she was sworn-in Smith was shot and killed at her home.

Virginia
1930
Callie Wright, first female elected mayor of Troutdale, Virginia
1948
Minnie Miller, first woman elected mayor of Clintwood, Virginia
1950
Dorothy Davis, first woman elected mayor of Washington, Virginia
1962
Eleanor P. Sheppard, first woman elected mayor of Richmond, Virginia
1963
Ann Hitch Kilgore, first woman mayor of Hampton, Virginia
1986
Jessie M. Rattley, first woman and African American elected by fellow Council members as mayor of the City of Newport News, Virginia
1988
Meyera E. Oberndorf, first woman elected mayor of Virginia Beach, Virginia
1991
Patsy Ticer, first woman elected mayor of Alexandria, Virginia
2008
Mimi Elrod, first woman elected mayor of Lexington, Virginia
Linda Johnson, first woman elected mayor of Suffolk, Virginia
2018
Nikuyah Walker, first African-American female mayor of Charlottesville, Virginia.
Treney Tweedy, first woman mayor of Lynchburg, Virginia.

Washington
1926
Bertha Knight Landes, first woman Mayor of Seattle, Washington and first woman mayor of a major American city
1953
Amanda Benek Smith, first woman mayor of Olympia, Washington
1975
Betty Edmondson, first woman mayor of Yakima, Washington
1977
Joyce Ebert, first woman to serve as mayor of Everett, Washington
2012
Kelli Linville, first woman elected mayor of Bellingham, Washington
2017
Anne McEnerny-Ogle first woman elected mayor of Vancouver, Washington
Cassie Franklin, first woman elected Mayor of Everett, Washington

West Virginia
1937
Stella Eddy, first woman mayor of Friendly, West Virginia

Wisconsin
1923
Lulu P. Shaw, first woman mayor of the City of Crandon, Wisconsin. 
1934
Mary Spellman, first woman mayor of Beaver Dam, Wisconsin

Wyoming

1912
Susan Wissler, mayor of Dayton, Wyoming
Wissler was the first woman mayor in Wyoming
1920
Grace Miller, first woman elected mayor of Jackson, Wyoming
2008
Nancy Tia Brown, first woman elected mayor of Cody, Wyoming
2014
Louise Carter-King, first woman elected mayor of Gillette, Wyoming
2016
Marian Orr, first woman elected mayor of Cheyenne, Wyoming

U.S. territories and associated states

District of Columbia
1990
Sharon Pratt Kelly, first woman elected Mayor of the District of Columbia

Puerto Rico
1946
Felisa Rincón de Gautier, first woman mayor of San Juan, Puerto Rico and first woman mayor of a capital city in United States soil

See also 

 List of first women mayors

References

Mayor
Women
Mayors
First mayors, United States
History of women in the United States